Farajabad (also Romanized as Farajābād) is a village in Ashna Khvor Rural District, in the Central District of Khomeyn County, Markazi Province, Iran. At the 2006 census, its population was 656, in 156 families.

References 

Populated places in Khomeyn County